Steno is an impact crater on Mars, located in the Mare Australe quadrangle at 68.0°S latitude and 115.6°W longitude. It measures  in diameter and was named after Danish scientist Nicolas Steno (1638–1686). The name was approved in 1973, by the International Astronomical Union (IAU) Working Group for Planetary System Nomenclature.

See also
 List of craters on Mars

References 

Mare Australe quadrangle
Impact craters on Mars